Baltinglass was a constituency represented in the Irish House of Commons until its abolition on 1 January 1801.

Borough
This was a parliamentary borough based in the town of Baltinglass in County Wicklow.

In the Patriot Parliament of 1689 summoned by James II, Baltinglass was not represented.

Members of Parliament, 1664–1801
1665–1666 Richard Bulkeley

1689–1801

Notes

References

Bibliography

Constituencies of the Parliament of Ireland (pre-1801)
Historic constituencies in County Wicklow
1664 establishments in Ireland
1800 disestablishments in Ireland
Constituencies established in 1664
Constituencies disestablished in 1800